Nicola Belmonte (born 15 April 1987) is a former Italian professional footballer. He preferred to play as a right back, but could also play as a centre back.

Career

Bari

Siena
In July 2008, he was signed by A.C. Siena in co-ownership deal, for €1.2 million, However, after just played one league match for Siena in 2008–09 Serie A, Belmonte returned to A.S. Bari on loan. In the first season he played a few games, as the team had Leonardo Bonucci and Andrea Ranocchia as centre-backs.

In September 2010, he extended his contract with Bari from 2013 to 2015. In ca. 2010  his contract with Siena also extended to 30 June 2014. He was the centre-back of the team along with Marco Rossi, but sometimes moved to right back when Andrea Masiello was unavailable. The coach also tested Andrea Raggi as starting rightback at the start of season, made Belmonte as sub and A.Masiello moved to centre-back. Despite the arrival of Kamil Glik in mid-season, Glik injury made Belmonte's role unaffected. He also missed a few games since 24 January due to injury. He was replaced in the first half on 6 March, his first match since injury.

On 23 June 2011, he returned to Siena for a second spell at the club. Bari and Siena made a pure player swap, which Belmonte (€1.25 million), Pedro Kamata (€500,000) and Filippo Carobbio (€500,00) moved to Siena outright, and Abdelkader Ghezzal moved to Bari outright (€2.25 million).

On 10 August 2012, he was suspended for 6 months due to involvement in 2011 Italian football scandal; the ban later reduced to 4 months by Tribunale Nazionale di Arbitrato per lo Sport of CONI.

Udinese
On 17 June 2014, Belmonte was signed by Udinese Calcio on a free transfer.

Catania
On 8 January 2015, Belmonte was signed by Calcio Catania.

Perugia
On 27 July 2015, Belmonte was signed by Perugia.

Robur Siena
On 14 September 2018, he returned for the third time to Siena, signing a three-year contract. On 24 May 2019, he had to announce his retirement from playing due to persistent medical problems with his knee.

References

External links
 
 

Living people
1987 births
Sportspeople from Cosenza
Italian footballers
Association football defenders
Serie A players
Serie B players
Serie C players
S.S.C. Bari players
A.S. Melfi players
A.C.N. Siena 1904 players
Udinese Calcio players
Catania S.S.D. players
A.C. Perugia Calcio players
Footballers from Calabria